Wishmaster is a 1997 American fantasy horror film directed by Robert Kurtzman. The film was executive produced by Wes Craven, and is the only film of the Wishmaster series with his name attached. Its plot concerns a djinn, a wish-granting, evil genie who is released from a jewel and seeks to capture the soul of the woman who discovered him, thereby opening a portal and freeing his fellow djinn to inhabit and enslave the Earth.

The film stars Andrew Divoff as The Djinn and Tammy Lauren.

The film was followed by three sequels, Wishmaster 2: Evil Never Dies (1999), Wishmaster 3: Beyond the Gates of Hell (2001) and Wishmaster: The Prophecy Fulfilled (2002). The first and second movies are considered to be in the horror genre, while the third and fourth movies have less horror elements and are more associated with action and romance films.

Plot
A narrator (Angus Scrimm) explains that when "God breathed life into the universe…the light gave birth to Angels…the earth gave birth to man...the fire gave birth to the djinn, creatures condemned to dwell in the void between the worlds." If a person wakes a djinn they will receive three wishes, but the third wish will free legions of djinn on Earth. In 1127, one of these Djinn (Andrew Divoff) asks a Persian emperor to make his second wish. When the emperor wishes to see wonders, the Djinn uses his powers to torture and mutilate people in the palace. The emperor is horrified, but the Djinn tells him to use his third wish to set things right. Before the emperor can make his third wish, Zoroaster (Ari Barak), a sorcerer, explains the consequences of the third wish and reveals a fire opal, which pulls the Djinn inside and traps him.

In present-day America, Raymond Beaumont (Robert Englund) supervises workers lowering a box containing an antique statue of Ahura Mazda onto a ship. The crane operator Mickey Torelli (Joseph Pilato) is drunk and drops the box, killing Beaumont's assistant Ed Finley (Ted Raimi) and destroying the statue. A dockworker steals the fire opal from the rubble and pawns it. Eventually the jewel reaches Regal Auctioneers, where Nick Merritt (Chris Lemmon) instructs appraiser Alexandra "Alex" Amberson (Tammy Lauren) to examine it, which wakes the Djinn. Alex sees something inside the jewel and leaves it with her close friend and colleague, Josh Aickman (Tony Crane), to analyze. As he is collecting data, the gem explodes, destroying the lab and releasing the Djinn. Josh, wounded, wishes for relief from his physical pain, and the Djinn "grants" his wish by killing him.

Alex, having been informed of Josh's death by Lieutenant Nathanson (Ricco Ross), tracks the gem to the statue which she tracks to Beaumont, who sends Alex to visit Wendy Derleth (Jenny O'Hara), a folklore professor, who explains the history of the gem and the nature of the djinn: a djinn grants wishes in exchange for souls, but as djinns are demonic in nature, the wishes will be twisted into curses for the djinn's amusement. Later, Alex learns that the Djinn needs to power the gem with human souls and then grant her (the person who originally released him) three wishes before he can open the gateway to release his fellow djinn on Earth; meanwhile, the Djinn takes the form of a dead man and uses the name Nathaniel Demerest. He kills a pharmacist (Reggie Bannister) with the wish of a vengeful vagrant (George 'Buck' Flower) and grants sales clerk Ariella's (Gretchen Palmer) wish for eternal beauty by turning her into a mannequin. Searching for Alex, he goes to Nathanson to gain her information.  Nathanson refuses to help him, but the Djinn grants Nathanson's wish to easily prove a criminal's guilt by having the criminal go on a shooting spree inside the police precinct, and in the chaos finds Alex's home address and leaves.

He next visits Nick, killing a security guard (Kane Hodder) along the way by fusing him into stained glass (when the guard says he'd "like to see" the Djinn "go through me"). Nick facetiously agrees to help in exchange for a million dollars - which he receives when his mother takes out a life insurance policy and is killed the next day in a plane crash.

Alex sees troubling visions every time the Djinn grants wishes. She consults Derleth again, but soon realizes that she is talking to the Djinn, who has killed Derleth and taken her form. The Djinn confronts Alex and offers her three wishes. In the spirit of fair play, he offers her a "free" wish, just to see what will happen.  She wishes for him to shoot himself, but he is immortal and the gunshot fails to harm him. Using the first of her three official wishes, Alex wishes to know what he is. The Djinn teleports her to his hellish world within the gem which terrifies her as he boasts his evil to her. She then wishes herself to escape back to her apartment, alone.

The Djinn had been threatening Alex's sister, Shannon (Wendy Benson), so Alex hurries to a party Beaumont invited them to earlier. The Djinn follows, again disguised as Nathaniel Demerest. Alex tells doorman Johnny Valentine (Tony Todd) to hold the Djinn, as he is trying to kill her; however, the Djinn manipulates Valentine into making a wish "to escape [his routine life]", allowing the Djinn to trap Valentine in a Chinese water torture cell, making his way into the party. The Djinn charms Beaumont, who wishes his party would be unforgettable, and thus the Djinn causes artwork to kill Beaumont, the guests, and the security guards called in to help. Eventually the Djinn corners the sisters and attempts to scare Alex into making her third wish by trapping Shannon in a burning painting.

Alex wishes that Torelli had not been drunk at work two days ago, which the Djinn is forced to grant, but this undoes the events that followed the destruction of the statue and traps the djinn in the fire opal again. The now sober Torelli lowers the crate with no problems. Alex visits Josh — now alive again — who notices that Alex seems pleased with herself, though she does not explain why. Inside the jewel on the statue of Ahura Mazda — now in Beaumont's private collection — the Djinn sits on a throne, waiting to be released.

Cast

Main cast 
 Tammy Lauren as Alexandra Amberson
 Andrew Divoff as The Djinn / Nathaniel Demerest
 Robert Englund as Raymond Beaumont
 Chris Lemmon as Nick Merritt
 Wendy Benson as Shannon Amberson
 Tony Crane as Josh Aickman
 Jenny O'Hara as Wendy Derleth
 Ricco Ross as Lieutenant Nathanson
 Gretchen Palmer as Ariella

Cameos 
 Angus Scrimm as narrator (voice only)
 George 'Buck' Flower as Homeless Man
 Ted Raimi as Ed Finney
 Kane Hodder as Merritt's Guard
 Tony Todd as Johnny Valentine
 Reggie Bannister as Pharmacist
 Joseph Pilato as Torelli
 Dennis Hayden as Security Guard
 Tom Savini as Man in Pharmacy

Production

Casting and cameos
Wishmaster is notable for featuring many actors from popular horror films. Robert Englund, who was Freddy Krueger in the Nightmare on Elm Street series, played an antique collector and Kane Hodder, who played Jason Voorhees in the Friday the 13th series, played a security guard. Also in the film were Tony Todd from Candyman, Ted Raimi from Candyman, Darkman, Evil Dead II and Army of Darkness, Ricco Ross from Aliens, Joseph Pilato from Day of the Dead, Reggie Bannister and the voice of Angus Scrimm (From the Phantasm films), Jenny O'Hara from the later Devil, Jack Lemmon's son Chris Lemmon from Just Before Dawn and George 'Buck' Flower (who was often used in small parts in various horror movies of the 1980s and early 1990s, often directed by John Carpenter). Verne Troyer of later Austin Powers fame appears as the smaller Wishmaster when he first escapes from his gem prison. A Pazuzu statue, a personification of the demonic figure which possessed Linda Blair's character in The Exorcist series, also appeared. This can be seen in Beaumont's collection room and on display during the party scene where it attacks some of the guests, though it is not formally referenced. A veiled reference to the Cthulhu Mythos can be heard in the incantation used to imprison the Djinn; the words "Nib Shuggurath", a spoonerism of Shub-Niggurath. Makeup artist Tom Savini also appears in a cameo as a customer at the pharmacy when Reggie Bannister's character dies.

Many crew members, including director Robert Kurtzman (man killed by piano), had small cameos in the film.

Writing
Writer Peter Atkins, also known for his work on Hellraiser films, intentionally made some surnames of characters in the film (Beaumont, Finney, Etchison, Clegg, Derleth, Merritt and Aickman) match the names of writers of horror and fantasy fiction. Josh Aickman (played by Tony Crane), explains to Alexandra Amberson (played by Tammy Lauren) that he can't test the opal immediately because he has, "...about 2 hours' worth of Professor Leiber's bullshit to take care of first." This Professor does not make an appearance in the film and is not listed in the credits but is a reference to horror, fantasy, science fiction writer Fritz Leiber.

Reception

Box office
Wishmaster was shot on an estimated budget of US$5 million and its total domestic gross was US$15,738,769. During its opening weekend in theaters, 19–21 September 1997, Wishmaster made US$6,000,000, putting it in third place at the box office, behind In & Out (which was debuting in first place) and The Game (which was in second place during its second week).

Critical response
The film was panned by critics. On Rotten Tomatoes it has an approval rating of 25% based on 32 reviews, with an average rating of 3.97/10. The site's Consensus reads: "Wishmaster searches for horror in the exploits of a supernatural being--one whose powers, alas, evidently do not include the ability to summon a compelling script".

Peter Stack of the San Francisco Chronicle called it "an extravaganza of bad special effects and worse acting". Of the few positive reviews, The Times of Northwest Indiana critic Christopher Sheid gave it a B+ and stated that "considering that the djinn itself is essentially a combination of Pinhead and Freddy, it's safe to say "Wishmaster" is a movie respectful of its influences. It's also respectful of its audience's intelligence, which is to say this shocker doesn't bore us with the pretense of trying to be smart... You couldn't wish for a better low-budget fright flick."

Novelization
In 2020, an official novelization of the film was written by Christian Francis and published by Encyclopocalypse Publications.

References

External links

 

1997 films
1997 horror films
1997 fantasy films
1997 independent films
1990s supernatural films
American independent films
American supernatural horror films
1990s English-language films
Films scored by Harry Manfredini
Films about wish fulfillment
Films directed by Robert Kurtzman
Films set in Iran
Genies in film
Artisan Entertainment films
Lionsgate franchises
Wishmaster films
1990s American films